Christoph Girardet is a German filmmaker and artist. He lives and works in Hanover.

Biography 
Girardet studied fine arts and film/video from 1988 to 1993 at the Braunschweig University of Art under Gerhard Büttenbender and Birgit Hein.

He had produced videos, video-installations and films since 1989. He collaborated with Volker Schreiner and often works with Matthias Müller.

Christoph Girardet works primarily with found footage. It serves as source material for his visual research, in the course of which he initially dissembles and deconstructs scenes, before reassembling them in a way such that the actual structures and internal mechanisms of their content are rendered visible.

In 2000 Girardet received a scholarship for the International Studio & Curatorial Program in New York and in 2004 the Villa Massimo scholarship in Rome.

Filmography 

 Misty Picture (2021)*
 Fountain (2021)
 Screen (2018)*
 It Was Still Her Face (2017)
 Rear (2016)
 personne (2016)*
 Second Chance Man (2016)
 Synthesis (2015)
 Fabric (2014)
 Cut (2013)*
 Dirigible (2012)
 Meteor (2011)*
 Maybe Siam (2009)*
 Contre-jour (2009)* (Special mention at the 59th Berlin International Film Festival)
 Storyboard (2007)
 Pianoforte (2007)
 Colosseoloop (2007)
 Kristall (2006)* (Won the Deutscher Kurzfilmpreis)
 Fiction Artists (2004)
 Play (2003)*
 Mirror (2003)*
 Absence (2002)
 Beacon (2002)*
 Manual (2002)*
 Scratch (2001)
 Phoenix Tapes (1999)*
 Release (1996)
 Fieberrot (1993)
 Random Cuts (1993)
 Schwertkampf (1991)

*together with Matthias Müller

Exhibitions 

Kunstmuseum Wolfsburg**, Landesmuseum Hannover**, Museum für Kunst und Gewerbe Hamburg, DB Museum Nuremberg**, Sprengel Museum, Werkleitz Festival**, Georgengarten**, Mausoleum & Meisterhäuser**, Deutscher Künstlerbund**, Landesvertretung Niedersachsen**, Kunstmuseum Ravensburg, Kunstverein Hannover, VKunst**, Kunstverein Hildesheim, Museum Goch**, Kunstverein Bochum **, me Collectors Room Berlin**, Huis Huguetan, Projektraum Akku**, Kunsthalle Erfurt**, Zeppelin Museum**, Écomusée du pays de la cerise**, Kunsthaus Centre PasquArt**, West Den Haag**, Kino der Kunst**, Trapéz Gallery, Thomas Erben Gallery, Wilhelm-Hack-Museum**, Fotomuseum Winterthur**, Centre d’art Contemporain Yverdon-les-bains**, Michael Fuchs Galerie**, Gingko Art Space**, New Media Gallery**, BBB centre d’art**, Oakville Galleries**, Campagne Première, Fonds régional d’art contemporain de Picardie**, Young Projects Gallery**, Centre d’art contemporain La Halle des bouchers**, Solar Galeria de Arte Cinemática, Filmhuis Den Haag**, National Centre for Contemporary Arts**, Nordstern Videokunstzentrum**, Carroll / Fletcher**, Flint Institute of Arts, Lichtrouten Luedenscheid**, Kunstraum Pro Arte**, Kunst- und Ausstellungshalle der Bundesrepublik Deutschland**, Palais de Tokyo**, Bê Cúbico, Royal Saltworks at Arc-et-Senans**, Kunstverein Langenhagen, Kunstsammlung Nordrhein-Westfalen**, EYE Film Institute Netherlands**, Distrito 4 Contemporary Art Gallery, KunstKulturQuartier, Institut français de Prague**, Deutsches Historisches Museum**, National Taiwan Museum of Fine Arts**, KasselerKunstVerein & Kulturbahnhof Kassel**, Videonale**, BWA Contemporary Art Gallery**, CaixaForum Barcelona**, Heidelberger Kunstverein**, Centro Andaluz de Arte Contemporáneo**, KW Institute for Contemporary Art**, Centro Cultural de Lagos**, Galerie Lukas Feichtner**, Vancouver Art Gallery**, Galerie für Gegenwartskunst, Pazo da Cultura**, Deichtorhallen**, Landcommenderij Alden Biesen**, Marta Herford**, Globe Gallery**, Arts Space Wodonga**, freiraum quartier 21**, KunstFilmBiennale**, Museo Nacional Centro de Arte Reina Sofía**, Centre Pompidou**, Centro de Memória**, Foro Artistico, Insa Art Space**, Kunsthaus Glarus**, The Block**, Badischer Kunstverein**, Vooruit Arts Centre**, Hirshhorn Museum and Sculpture Garden**, Sesc Avenida Paulista**, Musée d ́Art Moderne et Contemporain de Strasbourg**, Villa Croce Museum of Contemporary Art**, Sigmund Freud Museum Vienna, BOZAR, Walker Art Center, Second Street Gallery, Skulpturenmuseum Glaskasten Marl, Justina M. Barnicke Gallery**, Kunsthalle Lingen**, Berwick Film & Media Arts Festival**, Zentrum Paul Klee**, European Media Art Festival**, Museum van Hedendaagse Kunst**, Center for Curatorial Studies, Bard College**, Berlinale – Forum Expanded**, HangarBicocca**, STUK Kunstencentrum**, Overbeck-Gesellschaft**, Edith-Russ-Haus für Medienkunst**, Museum der Moderne Salzburg**, Oper Leipzig**, Collection Lambert Avignon**, Shedhalle Zürich**, Centre Cultural el Casino**, Kunsthalle Bremen**, K21 Kunstsammlung**, Lenbachhaus**, Museum der bildenden Künste**, ZKM Center for Art and Media Karlsruhe**, New Society for Visual Arts**, Forum Stadtpark**, Hochschule für Grafik und Buchkunst Leipzig**, Towner Gallery**, Guido Costa Projects**, Staatliche Kunsthalle Baden-Baden**, Art Museum of the province of Nuoro**, Apeejay Media Gallery**, Städtische Galerie Lüdenscheid**, ZKMax**, International Short Film Festival Oberhausen**, Magazzino d‘Arte Moderna**, Timothy Taylor Gallery, Site Gallery, Bates College Museum of Art**, Accademia Tedesca Roma Villa Massimo**, Institute of Contemporary Art**, Galería DV - Distrito Cu4tro**, Art Museum Z33**, Kunstraum Drochtersen-Hüll, Sketch**, Kunsthalle Exnergasse**, Centrum Beeldende Kunst**, Blue Coat Gallery, Milch Gallery, New Museum of Contemporary Art**, De Appel**, The Garage**, Niedersächsisches Ministerium für Wissenschaft und Kultur**, York Art Gallery**, Museum Schloss Hardenberg, California State University**, Fullerton Bienal de Valencia**, Queens Museum**, Galerie du Forum**, Roebling Hall**, Tokyo Opera City Art Gallery**, Hiroshima City Museum of Contemporary Art**, CaixaForum Lleida**, Sean Kelly Gallery, Goethe Institut Budapest, MoMA PS1**, Kunstraum Kreuzlingen**, Galerie Barbara Thumm**, Art Gallery of Hamilton**, Brandts Museum of Photographic Art**, Trafó**, Bunkier Sztuki**, Kunsthalle Bielefeld, Kunsthalle Artmax, Kunsthallen Nikolaj**, Schloss Agathenburg**, Modern Art Oxford**, Museum of Contemporary Art Australia**, Van Abbemuseum**, Kunstverein Wolfenbüttel, Städtische Galerie Delmenhorst**, National Museum, Poznań**, Kunstraum Wuppertal, Neuer Berliner Kunstverein**, Weserburg**, transmediale**, Kunstverein Celle, Bauhaus Dessau.**

**group exhibition

References

External links 
 Homepage
 Villa Massimo 
 Campagne Première Galerie

Living people
German experimental filmmakers
1966 births